For the 1967–68 season, Carlisle United F.C. competed in Football League Division Two.

Results & fixtures

Football League Second Division

Football League Cup

FA Cup

References
 11v11

Carlisle United F.C. seasons